Vincent van Gogh (1853–1890) was a post-impressionist Dutch painter.

Van Gogh may also refer to:

Film
 Van Gogh (1948 film), a film by Alain Resnais
 Van Gogh (1991 film), a film by Maurice Pialat

Music
 Van Gogh (band), a Serbian rock band
 Van Gogh (Van Gogh album)
 Mike Dirnt or Van Gough, musician in the Green Day side project The Network
 Van Gogh, an album by Ras Kass
 Van Gogh, a 1991 video opera by Michael Gordon
 Van Gogh, a 2007 album by Alarm Will Sound of the 2003 version of the opera

Other uses
Van Gogh (surname), a surname (and list of people with the surname
Van Gogh (horse), Thoroughbred racehorse
 Mv Van Gogh, a Dutch-owned passenger cruise ship
 Van Gogh Primary, a primary school in London named after Vincent Van Gogh

See also
 Vango (disambiguation)